Jim Lee "Earthquake" Hunt (October 5, 1938 – November 22, 1975) was an American professional football player who was a defensive tackle for the American Football League's Boston Patriots from 1960 through 1969, and for the NFL' Boston Patriots in 1970. He was a four-time AFL All-Star, and was one of only 20 men to play the entire ten years of the AFL.  He was used as a defensive end occasionally. He played college football for the Prairie View A&M Panthers.

Professional career
Hunt was drafted out of Prairie View A&M University in the 16th round of the 1960 NFL Draft by the Chicago Bears, but decided to sign as an original member of the Boston Patriots. He was nicknamed 'Earthquake' because it was said that the ground rumbled when he rushed the passer. He also was the team's fastest defensive lineman.

He was a four-time AFL All-Star and was voted the best pass-rushing tackle in the AFL in 1967.

Hunt recovered fumbles by Cotton Davidson, Al Dorow, Tom Flores, Mickey Slaughter, Ode Burrell, Darrell Lester, Daryle Lamonica, Steve Tensi, Bobby Burnett, Marlin Briscoe, Bob Cappadona, Robert Holmes, Don Trull and Larry Csonka. He returned a fumble by Don Trull 51 yards in the Patriots 45-17 loss to the Houston Oilers at the Houston Astrodome on December 15, 1968.

He led the team with 9 sacks in 1966 and totaled 29 career sacks of 19 different QB's. He recorded sacks of Frank Tripucka, George Herring, Tom Flores, John Hadl, Jacky Lee, Len Dawson, John McCormick, Jack Kemp, Joe Namath, Don Trull, Max Chobian, Daryle Lamonica, Steve Tensi, Rick Norton, Pete Beathard, Jim LeClair, Bob Griese, Earl Morrall & James Harris.

Hunt holds the AFL Record for the most career fumble recoveries. His number was retired by the team and was inducted into its Hall of Fame. He is a member of the Patriots All-1960s (AFL) Team and played in 142 games during his 12-year career.

His death at a young age was caused from a heart attack.

See also
Other American Football League players

External links
 New England Patriots bio

Boston Patriots players
American Football League All-Star players
Players of American football from Texas
Prairie View A&M Panthers football players
1975 deaths
1938 births
American Football League players
National Football League players with retired numbers